"Dead Embryonic Cells" is Sepultura's second single, as well as the second of three to be released from the album Arise. A music video for the song was produced and can be found on the VHS release Third World Chaos, which itself was released on DVD as part of Chaos DVD. The video features footage of the band performing in the wilderness accompanied by imagery from the album.

At this stage in their career, the band had recorded little material to be used as B-sides, which is why the Arise singles are so similar. This single and the next, "Under Siege (Regnum Irae)" have exactly the same artwork (a detail of the Arise album cover artwork by Michael Whelan) and B-sides.

The song appears on the Liberty City Hardcore station in both Grand Theft Auto IV: The Lost and Damned and Grand Theft Auto: The Ballad of Gay Tony. The station notably features Max Cavalera as the radio DJ.

Track listing
"Dead Embryonic Cells" (album version)
"Orgasmatron" (Motörhead cover)
"Troops of Doom" (This is the re-recorded version of the song which originally appeared on the album Morbid Visions.)

Personnel
Max Cavalera – lead vocals, rhythm guitar
Igor Cavalera – drums
Andreas Kisser – lead guitar, bass (uncredited)
Paulo Jr. – bass (credited, but did not perform)
Produced by Scott Burns and Sepultura
Recorded and engineered by Scott Burns
Mixed by Andy Wallace
Assistant engineers: Fletcher McClean and Steve Sisco

References

Sepultura songs
1991 singles
1991 songs
Roadrunner Records singles
Anti-war songs
Songs about death
Songs about the media
Songs written by Igor Cavalera
Songs written by Max Cavalera
Songs written by Andreas Kisser
Songs written by Paulo Jr.